Eduardo Baccari (August 18, 1871 – July 11, 1952) was an Italian politician. He had been governor of Cyrenaica for a short time in 1922. He had been appointed for the office by Giovanni Amendola, the last minister of colonies before Mussolini's coming to power in October 1922, and removed after the affirmation of the latter's government.

Formerly, he had been sent to London and Italian Somaliland to define the latter's border with  British one.

References

1871 births
1952 deaths
Italian colonial governors and administrators
People from Benevento